is a Japanese sailing ship that serves as a museum ship in Tokyo. It is displayed at the Etchujima Campus of the Tokyo University of Marine Science and Technology.

Construction
The ship was constructed for the Japanese government in Govan (now part of Glasgow, Scotland) in 1873 by Robert Napier and Sons. She was built as a lighthouse tender as a two-masted ship.

Lighthouse ship
The Meiji Maru was used for the Japanese government's lighthouse service.

Imperial voyages
The Emperor Meiji sailed on the ship in 1876, from Aomori to Hakodate, and Hakodate to Yokohama. The ship contains a decorated cabin for the sole use of the emperor. In Japan the third Monday in July is Marine Day, which originally commemorated the emperor's arrival in Yokohama at the end of his journey on the ship.

Tokyo Nautical School
In 1897 it was transferred to the Tokyo Nautical School for use as a moored training ship. Tokyo Nautical School later became part of the Tokyo University of Maritime Science and Technology.

Refitting
In 1898 she was re-rigged as a full-rigged ship by the Shomei Shipbuilding Company in Shinagawa.

Museum ship
In 1964 it was moved to the Tokyo University of Mercantile Marine to be preserved as a memorial.

In 1988 an eight-year restoration was completed.

Notes and references

Museum ships in Japan
1873 ships
Ships built in Govan
Merchant ships of Japan
Training ships of Japan
Lighthouse tenders
Tall ships of Japan